Herman John Garretson (June 26, 1890 – December 8, 1972) was an American football and basketball coach. He served as the head football coach at Parsons College in Fairfield, Iowa in 1916 and at Iowa Wesleyan College in Mount Pleasant, Iowa from 1921 to 1922. Garretson  was also the head basketball coach at Iowa Wesleyan from 1921 to 1923, compiling a record of 18–8.

Garretson was married twice, first to Marion Scott Becker with whom he had three sons: Frank, Herman Jr. and Ronald. His oldest son, Frank E. Garretson, served in the Marine Corps during World War II and was decorated with the Navy Cross during the combats in Pacific. He remained in the Marines and retired as Brigadier general. Herman's second wife was Helen Huston.

References

External links
 

1890 births
1972 deaths
American football fullbacks
Basketball coaches from Iowa
Iowa Hawkeyes football players
Iowa Hawkeyes men's track and field athletes
Iowa Wesleyan Tigers football coaches
Iowa Wesleyan Tigers men's basketball coaches
Parsons Wildcats football coaches
People from Henry County, Iowa
Players of American football from Iowa
Track and field athletes from Iowa